Alexander Petrovich Skugarev (born 13 March 1975) is a retired Russian professional ice hockey center.

Career statistics

External links

1975 births
Amur Khabarovsk players
Avtomobilist Yekaterinburg players
Barys Nur-Sultan players
HC CSKA Moscow players
HC Dynamo Moscow players
Krylya Sovetov Moscow players
Lokomotiv Yaroslavl players
Living people
Russian ice hockey centres
People from Angarsk
Sportspeople from Irkutsk Oblast